Tommo Inc. is an American video game publisher based in City of Industry, California. Founded in 1990, Tommo started out as a small independent distributor of imported video games. Since 2006, Tommo also operates a publishing subsidiary, UFO Interactive Games, which is best known for publishing original games, such as several titles in the Raiden series. In July 2013, Tommo acquired Humongous Entertainment and over 100 classic games from the Atari bankruptcy proceedings. In October 2014, in conjunction with Night Dive Studios, Tommo launched its Retroism publishing label, which specializes in the re-release of classic video game titles into digital distribution channels. In 2017, it began working with a company known as Billionsoft to revive the long-defunct label Accolade and its brands, starting with the Bubsy series.

Games published

References

External links 
 

Video game publishers
Video game companies of the United States
American companies established in 1990
Video game companies established in 1990
1990 establishments in California
Companies based in the City of Industry, California